= Fondo Unido I.A.P =

Fondo Unido I.A.P. (Fondo Unido) was founded in 1955 under the auspice of American Society of Mexico, A.C. as part of a community effort brought forth by several Americans that wanted to help people in need. Over time, Fondo Unido’s objectives changed, having decided to focus more on assisting the Mexican community. In 1979, it was registered as an institution for private charity and incorporated into the Board of Private Assistance of Mexico City Districto Federal, working jointly with the United Way in the United States. A few years later, the institution decided to approach Mexican corporations and the general public, without drifting away from foreign corporations. In August 1989, the organization moved to its own offices and began to operate as an independent institution. That same year, Fondo Unido affiliated itself to the United Way International Network.

In 1992, Fondo Unido began its expansion to other parts of Mexico; currently it has a presence in 22 out of the 32 Mexican states. Along the US-Mexican border, the organization has a presence in the states of Chihuahua, Nuevo Leon, and Coahuila, and is also active in the Tijuana region. In these states, it has two main offices that overlook charitable giving activities: Fondo Unido Nuevo Leon, A.C. (Fondo Unido NL) that oversees charitable giving in its own state, Coahuila, Tamaulipas, and Zacatecas; and Fondo Unido Chihuahua, A.C. (Fondo Unido Ch) that oversees charitable giving in its state. Charitable giving in Tijuana is monitored by Fondo Unido I.A.P in Mexico City.
